Reba Paige Meagher (born 11 September 1967) is a former Australian politician who was a member of the New South Wales Legislative Assembly, representing the electoral district of Cabramatta. She was a minister in various portfolios from 2003 to 2008, including Minister for Health. On 6 September 2008 Meagher announced that she would not be seeking a ministerial appointment from new Premier Nathan Rees. On 13 September 2008 she announced her retirement from politics. She formally resigned on 17 September 2008.

Early life
Meagher was born in 1967 in Caringbah, New South Wales, the daughter of Les Meagher, a printer for the Sydney Morning Herald. She received her Higher School Certificate from Endeavour High School in 1985.  She graduated with a Bachelor of Arts from the University of Sydney in 1989, and a Master of Labour Law and Relations in 1992.

Political career
Meagher declared on 7 November 2008 at an inquiry that, just over an hour after the Cabramatta MP John Newman had been shot in front of his fiancee on 5 September 1994, the then Labor Party head John Della Bosca, offered the seat to Reba Meagher, confirming an offer he had first made hours before the killing.

Since entering Parliament, Meagher served in a number of ministerial and sub-ministerial positions:
Parliamentary Secretary Assisting the Minister for Transport and Minister for Roads on matters concerning Roads (April 1999 to March 2002)
Parliamentary Secretary Assisting the Minister for Police (March 2003 to April 2003)
Minister for Fair Trading (April 2003 to January 2005)
Minister Assisting the Minister for Commerce (April 2003 to January 2005)
Minister for Youth (January 2005 to April 2007)
Minister for Community Services (January 2005 to April 2007)
Minister for Aboriginal Affairs (November 2006 to April 2007)
Minister Assisting the Premier on Citizenship (November 2006 to April 2007)
Minister for Health (April 2007 to September 2008)

She also served on a number of Parliamentary Committees:
Member, Committee on the Office of the Ombudsman and the Police Integrity Commission (May 1995 to April 1998)
Member, Legislative Assembly Standing Ethics Committee (May 1995 to March 1999)
Member, Committee on the Independent Commission Against Corruption (May 1995 to March 1999)
Member, Joint Standing Committee upon Small Business (November 1996 to March 1999)
Member, Joint Select Committee into Injecting Rooms (June 1997 to February 1998)

References

External links 
Speeches in Hansard by Reba Meagher

1967 births
Living people
Members of the New South Wales Legislative Assembly
Australian Labor Party members of the Parliament of New South Wales
Labor Right politicians
21st-century Australian politicians
Women members of the New South Wales Legislative Assembly
21st-century Australian women politicians